The Valiente Formation is a geologic formation of the Bocas del Toro Group in the Bocas del Toro Province of northwestern Panama. The formation underlies the Nancy Point Formation and preserves bivalve, gastropod and scaphopod fossils dating back to the Serravallian period.

See also 

 List of fossiliferous stratigraphic units in Panama

References

Further reading 
 L. S. Collins and A. G. Coates. 1999. A paleobiotic survey of Caribbean faunas from the Neogene of the Isthmus of Panama. Bulletins of American Paleontology (357)

Geologic formations of Panama
Neogene Panama
Serravallian
Formations